Skein (real name Sybil Dvorak, also known as Gypsy Moth and Sybarite) is a fictional character, a mutant supervillain appearing in American comic books published by Marvel Comics.

Publication history
The character first appeared in Spider-Woman vol 1. #10 as Gypsy Moth, and was created by Mark Gruenwald and Carmine Infantino.

Fictional character biography
Sybil Dvorak was born in Focșani, Romania, in the shadow of the Carpathians. She was raised by Romani and spent much of her time alone nurturing her gardens and focusing on her mutant powers - the ability to telekinetically manipulate and control materials with her mind. She loved how the sensation of fiber, such as soft weaves and flowers, felt to her mental touch; hard objects felt abrasive to her.

Wandering onto the set of a remake of the movie Dracula, which was being filmed on location in Romania, she met the star, Jason Reed. He romanced her and convinced her to come with him back to his home in Los Angeles. Dvorak was essentially a prisoner in the house, as she was an illegal immigrant since Reed would not marry her. Reed was constantly away on "trips", and Dvorak feared that he was having affairs. She wove herself a costume using her powers, began calling herself Gypsy Moth, and directed her feelings of anger and betrayal by attacking Hollywood social gatherings. Jessica Drew (Spider-Woman) confronted Gypsy Moth at one such gathering and offered her friendship, but Dvorak tried to kill her in response, insisting she has no use for friends. Drew's boyfriend, S.H.I.E.L.D. Agent Jerry Hunt, shot Gypsy Moth, knocking her unconscious. However, Spider-Woman flew Gypsy Moth away from the party so that the authorities would not take her.

Soon after, Sybil managed to get her American citizenship and an inclusion into her husband Jason Reed's will. When he died of a supposed obstructed blood vessel in his heart, she inherited his home and his wealth.

She took on the name of Sybarite and used these new assets to start a hedonistic cult. "Sybarite" paid her followers illegal drugs in return for soft garments and animal bodies, which they stole and scavenged from various sources. Her followers captured Spider-Woman on one outing and brought her before Gypsy Moth. Spider-Woman attacked her and defeated her in battle. While she lay unconscious, Gypsy Moth was kidnapped by Locksmith and Tick-Tock.

Spider-Woman was also captured by Tick-Tock and Locksmith. Gypsy Moth was forced to work with her nemesis in order to escape, and then entangled Locksmith and Tick-Tock in their own clothing, leaving them out in the open for the police to find. She then reluctantly accepted an invitation from Spider-Woman to a victory party for Locksmith's former captives. During the party, Magnus the Sorcerer cast a spell removing all memory of Spider-Woman. Left with no idea where she was or how she got there, Gypsy Moth fled; however, the spell's effects dissipated shortly after.

The Shroud, another fellow prisoner of Locksmith, tracked Gypsy Moth down and recruited her for the Night Shift, a band of Los Angeles-based villains. Tick-Tock, her former captor, was also a member. The Night Shift used the Los Angeles sewers to move about the city; when these sewers were overrun with the mutated test subjects of the Power Broker, the Shroud employed the Night Shift in putting an end to the Power Broker's operations. She and the Night Shift battled Moon Knight in the Tower of Shadows. She then served as a member of Superia's Femizons. Gypsy Moth fought the second Spider-Woman (Julia Carpenter) during a fight between the Night Shift and the West Coast Avengers. Gypsy Moth asked Carpenter if she was related to the Spider-Woman she had encountered previously; Carpenter stated that she was not. They realized that Satannish had taken part of their souls and fought back against him.

Gypsy Moth later left the Night Shift, and joined the Crimson Cowl's Masters of Evil. Gypsy Moth aided the other Masters of Evil in their search for Justin Hammer's legacy, by helping them battle Plantman, Hawkeye and Songbird. Justin Hammer's legacy was a bio-toxin which could kill thousands of superhumans. Hawkeye attempted to convince Gypsy Moth and most of her teammates to switch sides, and to aide him in preventing the Crimson Cowl from obtaining the toxin. Gypsy Moth sided with Hawkeye "for kicks", designed a new costume for herself and changed her name to Skein.

As a part of Hawkeye's team of Thunderbolts, Skein helped thwart the Crimson Cowl by effectively unraveling the Crimson Cowl's costume, rendering her powerless. As a member of the Thunderbolts, Sybil fought a S.H.I.E.L.D. team and was present when the original team of Thunderbolts returned to Earth after having their own adventure on Counter-Earth.

Afterwards, the two Thunderbolts teams came together for a celebration. Members of the two teams contemplated whether to stay with or leave the group; Sybil announced that she did not intend to stay. Part of the reason Sybil had stayed with the team was the challenge of seducing Songbird but once rebuffed she saw no reason to stay. She retained her powers following M-Day.

During the Dark Reign storyline Skein is revealed as a member of the Initiative's new team for the state of Delaware, the Women Warriors.

During the Spider-Island storyline, Sybil returned to the Gypsy Moth identity as well as her life of crime upon creating a new costume. After being hired by the Spider Queen to kidnap Alicia Masters, she used her powers to seal Spider-Woman's mouth shut and change her costume into another Gypsy Moth suit, which led to the Thing mistakenly attacking the gagged heroine. After removing her gag and mask, Spider-Woman managed to defeat Spider-Queen and rescue Alicia.

Sybil later appeared as a member of the Menagerie (which also consisted of animal-themed villains Hippo, White Rabbit, and a new villain named Panda-Mania). They were on a rampage stealing expensive eggs from an auction until Spider-Man arrived. When White Rabbit referred to her as "Gypsy Moth", Sybil told White Rabbit to call her Skein with White Rabbit protesting that she called the group the Menagerie because of the villains' animal themes. During the battle, Skein destroyed Spider-Man's outfit, save for the mask, leaving him naked in front of bystanders. She and the Menagerie are defeated by Spider-Man. Skein and the rest of the Menagerie soon after commit a diamond heist which led to another defeat at Spider-Man's hands.

During the "Opening Salvo" part of the "Secret Empire" storyline, Sybil is once again seen as Gypsy Moth where she is recruited by Baron Helmut Zemo to join the Army of Evil.

During the "Spider-Geddon" storyline, Sybil in her Skein alias is seen with Night Shift members Digger, Dansen Macabre, the Brothers Grimm, and new member Waxman when they rob a bus. During this robbery, Skein robs the bus' people of their clothes. The group is thwarted by Superior Octopus whose outfit was made to be immune to Skein's abilities. Superior Octopus agrees to spare them more pain in exchange that the Night Shift becomes his agents where he will compensate them from his own funds. They agree to the terms and are ordered to return the stolen items. Superior Octopus leaves advising them never to cross him or they won't live long enough to regret it.

Powers and abilities
Sybil has the ability to telekinetically manipulate materials and objects with her mind. Because all matter has a powerful and specific "texture" to her mind, she prefers to only manipulate "soft" substances like fibers and other malleable, yielding substances (this preference extends to the point of her having a strong aversion to mentally manipulating anything hard or solid). Thus she confines her manipulation to such substances as fabrics (both organic and synthetic) and organic tissue such as that of plants or animals. The maximum amount of material she can manipulate at once is equivalent to the amount of weight she can lift physically. By concentrating, she can levitate herself and move through the air as if she were swimming, at up to a top speed of 20 miles per hour for periods of up to a half-hour before tiring from the mental exertion. She can carry loads weighing no more than her own body weight while airborne.

Canon of Sybil's wings

Marvel canon is inconsistent on the nature of her wings. Her origin story in Spider-Woman #48 recounts that she "wove" her wings using her telekinetic power. However, her first appearance in Spider-Woman #10 shows her wings growing out of slits in the skin of her back, and even established that they are connected to her nervous system.

References

External links
 Gypsy Moth/Skein at Marvel.com
 Gypsy Moth/Skein at Marvel Wiki
 Gypsy Moth/Skein at Comic Vine
 
 Gypsy Moth/Skein at Gay League

Characters created by Carmine Infantino
Characters created by Mark Gruenwald
Comics characters introduced in 1979
Fictional bisexual females
Fictional cult leaders
Fictional Romanian people
Fictional socialites
Marvel Comics female supervillains
Marvel Comics LGBT supervillains
Marvel Comics mutants